The Secretariat Stakes  is a Grade I American Thoroughbred horse race for three-year-olds over a distance of one mile on the turf. The event was originally raced at the now-closed Arlington Park in Arlington Heights, Illinois as a supporting stakes race on the Arlington Million racing program.

Churchill Downs, whose parent company owns the land of the defunct Arlington Park racetrack, originally planned to run the Secretariat Stakes in 2022, but the race was not run due to issues with the Churchill Downs turf course. The 2023 race will be run at Churchill-owned Colonial Downs in Virginia.

History

Precursor — Arlington Invitational 

In 1973, after Secretariat became the first U.S. Triple Crown winner in twenty five years, many race tracks wanted to have him race at their tracks. Arlington racetrack management offered to run him in the American Derby but it was too soon after his Belmont Stakes victory. Management pursed to create an event that would entice Secretariat's connections. This event was called the Arlington Invitational with $125,000 stakes offered in order to showcase Secretariat to Chicago racing fans and it was held 29 June 1973. A crowd of 41,223 witnessed seeing the three challengers grouped as a single betting entry at 6–1 and Secretariat was 1–20 odds-on which created a minus pool of $17,941. Both of these horses had lost to the Champion in the Triple Crown series. The performance produced a lasting impression to Arlington Park management.

Event 

One year and one day after Secretariat's performance at Arlington Park, track management scheduled a race in his honor. The inaugural event was held 30 June 1974 over a distance of  miles on the turf. The event was won in an upset with the 39-1 longshot Glossary winning. The event was set with Grade II status.

In 1984 the event was upgraded to Grade I status.

In 1985 the event was held at Hawthorne Race Course over a shorter distance of  miles.

There was no race run in 1988, 1998 and 1999.

In 2005 it was included in the Grand Slam of Grass, which offered a substantial bonus to the winner of this race, the Colonial Turf Cup, the Virginia Derby and the Breeders' Cup Turf.

In 2019 the race was cut back to one mile.

In 2020 due to the COVID-19 pandemic in the United States, Arlington Park did not schedule the event in their shortened meeting.

During the last year of racing at Arlington Park in 2021, the race was renamed the Bruce D. Stakes in honor of the late Bruce Duchossois, the son of track owner Richard L. Duchossois.

In March 2022 Churchill Downs Incorporated (which owns the Arlington Park property) announced that it would move the Secretariat Stakes to Churchill Downs along with several of Arlington's traditional stakes races, including the Arlington Million. A week and a half before the Secretariat was supposed to be run, Churchill announced that the Secretariat would not be contested due to issues with the Churchill Downs turf course, while the other major turf stakes formerly run at Arlington—the Arlington Million and the Beverly D. Stakes—would be run as scheduled.

In December 2022 an agreement was reached between Churchill Downs and the American Graded Stakes Committee to move the 2023 Arlington Million and its supporting races, including the Secretariat Stakes, to Colonial Downs in Virginia.

Records

Race record:
 1 mile: 1:35.50 – Valid Point (2019)
  miles: 1:59.65 – Kitten's Joy (2004)
  miles: 2:29.80 – Mac Diarmida (1978)

Margins:
  lengths – Stately Don  (1987)

Most wins by an owner:
 5 – Michael Tabor (1996, 2000, 2011, 2014, 2015)

Most wins by a jockey:
 3 – Pat Day (1983, 1991, 1995)
 3 – Kent Desormeaux (2002, 2009, 2010)

Most wins by a trainer:
 4 – Aidan O'Brien (2000, 2011, 2014, 2015)

Winners

Legend:

 
 

Notes:

§ Ran as an entry with stablemate Unbridled

See also
List of American and Canadian Graded races

References

Flat horse races for three-year-olds
Grade 1 turf stakes races in the United States
Graded stakes races in the United States
Turf races in the United States
1974 establishments in Illinois
Arlington Park
Horse races in Illinois
Recurring sporting events established in 1974
Churchill Downs
Churchill Downs horse races